The 2018–19 Vermont Catamounts men's basketball team represented the University of Vermont in the 2018–19 NCAA Division I men's basketball season. They played their home games at the Patrick Gym in Burlington, Vermont and were led by 8th-year head coach John Becker. They finished the season 27–7, 14–2 in America East play to win the regular season championship. They defeated Maine, Binghamton, and UMBC to be champions of the America East tournament. They earned the America East's automatic bid to the NCAA tournament where they lost in the first round to Florida State.

Previous season
The Catamounts finished the 2017–18 season 27–8, 15–1 in the America East Conference play to finish in first place. In the America East tournament, they defeated Maine and Stony Brook to advance to the championship game, where they lost to UMBC. As a regular season conference champion who failed to win their conference tournament, the Catamounts received an automatic bid to the National Invitation Tournament, where they lost to Middle Tennessee in the first round.

Roster

Schedule and results

|-
!colspan=12 style=| Exhibition

|-
!colspan=12 style=| Non-conference regular season

|-
!colspan=9 style=| America East Conference regular season

|-
!colspan=12 style=| America East tournament
|-

|-
!colspan=9 style=| NCAA tournament

Source

References

Vermont Catamounts men's basketball seasons
Vermont Catamounts
2018 in sports in Vermont
Cat
Vermont